Assumption of the Virgin Mary is a c.1637 oil on canvas painting by Peter Paul Rubens. It was commissioned for the high altar of the Carthusian Church in Brussels by Charles and Johannes Angelus de Schotte between 1629 and 1639. Two oil sketches for it are now in the Courtauld Institute and Yale University Art Gallery.

Prince Karl Eusebius von Liechtenstein acquired it in 1643 and it was placed on an altar in the parish church at Valtice from 1671.

References

Further reading
Baumstark, Reinhold, Liechtenstein: The Princely Collections, 1985, Editors: Bradford D. Kelleher, John P. O'Neill, Metropolitan Museum of Art and Sammlungen des Regierenden Fürsten von Liechtenstein, 0870993852, google books

1637 paintings
Paintings by Peter Paul Rubens
Rubens
Paintings in Vienna